The Timber Creek Review (TCR) is a literary journal, founded in 1994, and based in Greensboro, North Carolina. The journal's editor is John M. Freiermuth. 

TCR published short story, literary nonfiction and poetry. Work that appeared in the Timber Creek Review has been short-listed for  New Stories from the South. Writer's Digest named it the best new literary magazine.

Among the established writers whose careers the TCR helped launch are Corey Mesler,  Ron Cooper, Jacob Appel, Pamela Hughes, Brady Allen, Daniel Brugioni, Marion Hodge, and Marie Manilla.

See also
List of literary magazines

References

External links
 no website?

1994 establishments in North Carolina
Literary magazines published in the United States
Quarterly magazines published in the United States
Magazines established in 1994
Magazines published in North Carolina
Mass media in Greensboro, North Carolina